Sovu may refer to:

 Sovu, Rwanda, a village in the Southern Province of Rwanda
 Şovu, a village in the Lankaran Rayon of Azerbaijan.